Mostishchi is a rural locality (a village) in Andreyevskoye Rural Settlement, Sudogodsky District, Vladimir Oblast, Russia. The population was 8 as of 2010.

Geography 
Mostishchi is located 28 km southeast of Sudogda (the district's administrative centre) by road. Novaya is the nearest rural locality.

References 

Rural localities in Sudogodsky District